San Martín Sacatepéquez is one of 24 municipalities in the department of Quetzaltenango, Guatemala. According to the most recent government survey, the population of the municipality is 28,926 people.

Geography 
San Martín Sacatepéquez is located on the edge of the volcanic chain that divides the Western  Highlands of Guatemala from the coastal plain. Just below the volcanic chain, to the southwest, the rich Boca Costa (piedmont) soils extend toward the Pacific Ocean. To the northeast lies the altiplano, the elevated pumice-laden volcanic highlands.

As is true throughout much of the highlands of Guatemala, in San Martín weather is divided into two seasons: the rainy season—which lasts from early May to early November—and the dry season—which lasts from early November to early May.

Culture 

San Martín Sacatepéquez is predominantly inhabited by Indigenous peoples of Maya, Mam descent. Linguistically, San Martín is part of the Southern Mam speaking region of Guatemala. The town is also known as San Martín Chile Verde, due to the large quantity of green chili peppers its farmers historically grew and brought to Quetzaltenango to sell. The Laguna Chicabal, a crater lake and holy site for the Mam, is located within the municipal boundary of San Martín. San Martín is also notable due to the colorful traditional garb (known in Guatemala as traje) still worn by the residents. Although most Maya men throughout Guatemala have adopted Western clothing, a large population of men in San Martín still wear traje.

Notes

External links

Travel writing on San Martín Sacatepéquez
Local website (in Spanish)

Municipalities of the Quetzaltenango Department